Maloye Karinskoye is a rural locality (a village) in Karinskoye Rural Settlement, Alexandrovsky District, Vladimir Oblast, Russia. The population was 8 in 2010. There are three streets.

Geography 
Maloye Karinskoye is located on the Pichkura River, 11 km southwest of Alexandrov (the district's administrative centre) by road. Bolshoye Karinskoye is the nearest rural locality.

References 

Rural localities in Alexandrovsky District, Vladimir Oblast